George Gordon First Nation 86 is an uninhabited Indian reserve of the George Gordon First Nation in Saskatchewan.

References

Indian reserves in Saskatchewan
George Gordon First Nation